Józef Siemiradzki (March 28, 1858, Kharkov - December 12, 1933, Warsaw)  was a Polish , geologist and naturalist and explorer. He was professor of paleontology at the University of Lviv (1901-1933). Siemiradzki studied nature at the University of Tartu. He visited Latin America three times: 1882–1883, 1892, and 1895.

References
 Ewa Głowniak Biography of Józef Siemiradzki (1858-1933)
Hans von Berlepsch "Liste des oiseaux recueillis par MM. Stolzmann et Siemiradzki dans l'Ecuadeur occidental". Proceedings of the Zoological Society of London (in French): 

Polish ornithologists
19th-century Polish geologists
1933 deaths
1858 births
20th-century Polish geologists